The anthem of the Bolívar State, Venezuela, has lyrics written by José Manuel Agosto Méndez; the music for it was composed by Manuel Lara Colmenares. It was established as the anthem of the State by National Decree on 22 January 1910.

Lyrics in Spanish Language

Chorus

Lyrics in English Language

Chorus

With aureous burins your great exploits
the history in its pomps engraved forever;
your soil is center of enormous riches,
your sky, the most beautiful that the sun has illuminated!

I 
Gentle amazona with a smiling face,
valiant you show yourself over a high rock;
the laurels encircle your olympic forehead
and the wind hoists your graceful pennant!

II 
To the tragic encounter of hirsute lions,
your eagles went in a triumphal march;
and the sun at San Félix shone in your escutcheons!,
and your name was inmortal henceforth!

III 
You enclose, oh Homeland! the beautiful and the great.
The glory makes you famous, the honor shelters you.
And the ferocious Orinoco your chest expands
Singing your eternal love poem.

IV 
Guayana! Sanctuary full of music
that you offer to the content and relaxed soul,
may fate allow that forever in your bosom
Peace scatters the leaves from its roses and myrtles.

See also
 List of anthems of Venezuela

Anthems of Venezuela
Spanish-language songs